Club Reps is a factual entertainment programme made for ITV by STV Studios (then known as "SMG TV Productions"). It ran from 2002 to 2004. The programme has been repeated on Sky Real Lives, Pick and STV local channels STV Edinburgh and STV Glasgow.

Main series
In series 1, the show is in Faliraki in Rhodes and the series follows a team of Club 18-30 reps. Some of the main people featured in the series include; Resort manager Marie Slater, AKA "Maz"; Area controller Lee; and Club Rep Mark.

As with series 1, series 2 (Club Reps: The Workers) is also in Faliraki, although this time the series looks at individual people working in the resort. Some of the main people featured include: Lee from series 1 returns as he has left Club 18–30, Andy King, Stacey, and Charmaine.

In series 3, the show moved to Playa del Inglés in Gran Canaria. This series was similar to the first, as it followed the everyday working life of the small team of Club 18-30 reps there. Some of the main people featured include: Area controller Ash, Senior rep Max, Admin girl Syreeta, Rep Lou, and Rep Johnny Hormone.

Each series contained 10 episodes, totaling 30 episodes.

Spin-off series
In addition to the main series, there was a spin-off series to accompany the main program, known as Club Reps: Uncut (series 1, 2, and 3) and Club Reps: Aftersun (series 3).

The uncut series is an extended version of each episode that was broadcasts later on in the week on ITV2. This spinoff aired for every series with an increased duration from 30 to 60 minutes.

The Aftersun series was broadcast on ITV2 and each episode was 60 minutes in length, double that of the regular series. This series followed a similar format to the regular series 2, (Club Reps: The Workers) in where it focused on individual people unrelated to a Club 18-30 team. There were 6 episodes in this series.

History
The original series was filmed between April and October 2000.

Former EastEnders actor Joe Swash appeared in the very first episode of the first series; he was at the Hotel Matina in Faliraki with his friends who, after a night of anti-social behaviour, were kicked out of the hotel by "Maz".

The original series became an instant hit not least due to "Miss Nasty" resort manager Marie Slater known to viewers as "Maz". Nevertheless, she later claimed the show ruined her life.

Broadcasts
Club Reps was televised on the ITV Network and had sister shows, Club Reps: Uncut and Club Reps: Aftersun that were broadcast on ITV2 between 2002 and 2004.

After Club Reps
Over the years, Club Reps and Aftersun have all been repeated on Sky Real Lives, Pick and most recently in 2016 on STV local channels STV Edinburgh and STV Glasgow, where the "Uncut" version is also receiving its first rerun since the original broadcast.

Maz, who featured in series 1, now owns a bar called H. Nicholsons in Altrincham. This opened in February 2006. As well as this, she occasionally works as a television presenter in the tourism area. Lee Watson, who also featured in series 1 and additionally series 2, was a resident DJ in Blackpool nightclub, Syndicate up until its closure in 2011.
 Lee is also a successful DJ producer under the name Delta3.

Jonny Hormone moved on to a successful career as a football manager, managing Leicestershire Laundry Equipment Premier League side Glen Villa. He is good friends with famous comedian Rob Beckett and is nurturing an up and coming generation of menaces.

References

External links

2002 British television series debuts
2004 British television series endings
2000s British reality television series
2000s British travel television series
ITV reality television shows
Rhodes
Television series by STV Studios
Television shows set in Greece
Television shows set in Spain
Television shows set on islands